The list of Arkansas state high school tennis champions is based on the annual winner of the team competition at the state tennis tournament held by the Arkansas Activities Association each fall.

List of Arkansas state high school boys tennis champions 

The following is a list of Arkansas state team champions in boys tennis each fall of the school year:

 2018 - Haas Hall Academy Bentonville (2A)
 2017 - Haas Hall Academy Bentonville (2A)
 2016 – LR Catholic (7A), Greenwood (6A), Pulaski Academy (5A), Pottsville (4A), Episcopal Collegiate (3A), Parkers Chapel (2A)
 2015 – LR Catholic (7A), Jonesboro (6A), Pulaski Academy (5A), Shiloh Christian (4A), Episcopal Collegiate (3A), Riverside (2A)
 2014 – Bentonville and LR Central Tie (7A), Jonesboro (6A), Hot Springs Lakeside (5A), Shiloh Christian (4A), Episcopal Collegiate (3A), Riverside (2A)
 2013 – Bentonville (7A), Jonesboro (6A), Hot Springs Lakeside (5A), Arkansas Baptist (4A), Episcopal Collegiate (3A), Riverside (2A)
 2012 – Bentonville (7A), Jonesboro (6A), Pulaski Academy (5A), Valley View (4A), Piggott (3A), Conway Christian (2A)
 2011 – Bentonville, Jonesboro, HS Lakeside, Pulaski Academy, Episcopal Collegiate, Ridgefield Christian 
 2010 – Bentonville, Jonesboro, Central Arkansas Christian, Pulaski Academy, Episcopal Collegiate, Union Christian 
 2009 – LR Central, Jonesboro, HS Lakeside, Shiloh Christian, Episcopal Collegiate, Union Christian 
 2008 – LR Central, Jonesboro, HS Lakeside, Subiaco Academy, Episcopal Collegiate, Union Christian 
 2007 – LR Central, Mountain Home, Pulaski Academy, Valley View/Union Christian, LR Episcopal Collegiate, Acorn 
 2006 – LR Central, Texarkana, HS Lakeside, Fountain Lake, East Poinsett County, Crowley’s Ridge 
 2005 – LR Central, tie-HS Lakeside-Alma, tie-Valley View-Pulaski Academy-Central Arkansas Christian, LR Episcopal Collegiate 
 2004 – LR Central, HS Lakeside, Pulaski Academy, LR Episcopal Collegiate 
 2003 – (Fall) LR Central, HS Lakeside, Pulaski Academy, LR Episcopal Collegiate 
 2003 – LR Central, HS Lakeside, Pulaski Academy, LR Lutheran 
 2002 – LR Central, Nettleton, Pulaski Academy, Shirley 
 2001 – LR Central, HS Lakeside, Subiaco Academy, Shiloh Christian 
 2000 – LR Central, HS Lakeside, Subiaco Academy, Shiloh Christian 
 1999 – LR Catholic, HS Lakeside, Subiaco Academy, Arkansas Baptist 
 1998 – LR Fair, HS Lakeside, Central Arkansas Christian, Arkansas Baptist 
 1997 – tie-Bentonville-Russellville, HS Lakeside, Valley View, Arkansas Baptist 
 1996 – LR Central, HS Lakeside, Booneville, tie-Shirley-Ark School Math & Science 
 1995 – FS Southside, HS Lakeside, Booneville, Jessieville 
 1994 – FS Southside, Searcy, Fountain Lake, Jessieville 
 1993 – FS Southside, tie-Arkadelphia-Searcy, Subiaco Academy, Jessieville 
 1992 – LR Catholic, Searcy. Jessieville 
 1991 – LR Catholic, HS Lakeside, Jessieville
 1990 – Fayetteville, tie-HS Lakeside-Harrison, Subiaco Academy 
 1989 – Fayetteville, Harrison, Subiaco Academy 
 1988 – tie-LR Hall-LR Mills, HS Lakeside, Subiaco Academy 
 1987 – LR Catholic, HS Lakeside, McGehee 
 1986 – LR Catholic, Searcy, Harding Academy 
 1985 – LR Catholic, tie-Nettleton-McGehee, Dardanelle 
 1984 – Fayetteville, Magnolia, Harding Academy 
 1983 – Pine Bluff, LR Catholic, Magnolia, Pulaski Academy, Fountain Lake 
 1982 – LR Central, FS Southside, tie-Magnolia-Batesville, tie-Fountain Lake, Central Arkansas 
 1981 – LR Catholic, tie-Fayetteville-FS Southside, HS Lakeside, Pulaski Academy 
 1980 – LR Catholic, FS Southside, HS Lakeside, McGehee 
 1979 – NA 
 1978 – NA 
 1977 – NA 
 1976 – LR Catholic, Fayetteville, Siloam Springs, Gurdon 
 1975 – LR Catholic, FS Southside, Magnolia, Parkin 
 1974 – LR Catholic, FS Southside, Bentonville, tie-Prescott-Gurdon Clarksville 
 1973 – LR Catholic, Fayetteville, Bryant, Gurdon 
 1972 – Pine Bluff, Fayetteville, Bryant, Harding Academy 
 1971 – Pine Bluff, LR Catholic, Fordyce, FS St. Annes 
 1970 – Fayetteville, LR Parkview, McGehee 
 1969 – LR Hall, Paragould, FS St. Annes 
 1968 – LR Hall, LR Catholic, tie-Fordyce-McGehee

List of Arkansas state high school girls tennis champions 

The following is a list of Arkansas state champions in girls tennis:

 2016 – Bentonville (7A), Mountain Home (6A), HS Lakeside (5A), Southside and Pocahontas Tie (4A), Episcopal Collegiate (3A), Haas Hall Academy Bentonville(2A)
 2015 – Bentonville (7A), Jonesboro (6A), HS Lakeside and Pulaski Academy Tie (5A), Brookland (4A), Episcopal Collegiate (3A), Union Christian (2A)
 2014 – Bentonville (7A), Lake Hamilton (6A), HS Lakeside (5A), Highland (4A), Episcopal Collegiate (3A), Parkers Chapel (2A)
 2013 – Rogers (7A), Lake Hamilton (6A), HS Lakeside (5A), Valley View (4A), Episcopal Collegiate (3A), Parkers Chapel (2A)
 2012 – Rogers (7A), Lake Hamilton (6A), HS Lakeside (5A), Nashville (4A), Episcopal Collegiate (3A), Riverside (2A)
 2011 – LR Central, Jonesboro, HS Lakeside, Valley View, Episcopal Collegiate, Riverside 
 2010 – LR Central, Jonesboro, HS Lakeside, Pulaski Academy (12), Episcopal Collegiate, Riverside 
 2009 – Bentonville, Jonesboro, HS Lakeside, Arkadelphia, Episcopal Collegiate, Union Christian 
 2008 – Mount St. Mary (9), Jonesboro, Greenwood, Jonesboro Westside, Episcopal Collegiate, Riverside 
 2007 – Bentonville, Jonesboro, HS Lakeside, Jonesboro Westside, Bismarck, Parkers Chapel 
 2006 – Bentonville, Jonesboro, HS Lakeside, Highland, Bergman, Parkers Chapel 
 2005 – Bentonville, Siloam Springs, Pulaski Academy (11), Bergman 
 2004 – LR Central, Greenwood, Pulaski Academy (10), Bergman 
 2003 – (Fall) FS Southside, HS Lakeside, Pulaski Academy (9), LR Christian 
 2003 – LR Central, HS Lakeside, Fountain Lake, tie, Jessieville-PB St. Joseph 
 2002 – Mount St. Mary (8), HS Lakeside, Cave City, PB St. Joseph 
 2001 – LR Central, HS Lakeside, Valley View, PB St. Joseph 
 2000 – Mount St. Mary (7), HS Lakeside, tie-Drew Central-Valley View, Shiloh Christian 
 1999 – Mount St. Mary (6), tie-HS Lakeside-Hot Springs, Fountain Lake, Jessieville 
 1998 – Mount St. Mary (5), HS Lakeside, Fountain Lake, Shiloh Christian 
 1997 – Jonesboro, HS Lakeside, tie-Fountain Lake-Paris, Shiloh Christian 
 1996 – FS Southside, HS Lakeside, Highland, tie-Shiloh Christian-Mulberry 
 1995 – Jonesboro, HS Lakeside, tie-Brinkley-Atkins, East Poinsett County 
 1994 – Bentonville, HS Lakeside, Pulaski Academy (8), tie-Hampton-Pottsville 
 1993 – Bentonville, tie-Hot Springs-Crossett, tie-Warren-Atkins, East Poinsett County 
 1992 – North Little Rock, tie-Searcy-Batesville, Pulaski Academy (7)
 1991 – North Little Rock, tie-Searcy-Crossett, Pulaski Academy (6)
 1990 – NLR Northeast, HS Lakeside, Highland
 1989 – NLR Northeast, HS Lakeside, Pulaski Academy (5)
 1988 – NLR Northeast, HS Lakeside, Pulaski Academy (4)
 1987 – FS Southside, tie-HS Lakeside-Cabot, tie-Pulaski Academy (3)-Highland-Shirley 
 1986 – tie-LR McClellan-Texarkana, Crossett, Fountain Lake 
 1985 – tie-LR McClellan-Texarkana, Crossett, Fountain Lake (3)
 1984 – LR Mount St. Mary (4), Crossett, Fountain Lake (2)
 1983 – LR Hall, Jonesboro, Batesville (4), Fountain Lake 
 1982 – LR Central (2), tie-Fayetteville-Jonesboro, Batesville (3), Fountain Lake 
 1981 – tie-LR Central-FS Northside, LR Mount St. Mary (3), Batesville (2), Pulaski Academy (2)
 1980 – Pine Bluff (4), LR Mount St. Mary (2), Batesville, Pulaski Academy 
 1979 – Pine Bluff (3), Texarkana 
 1978 – NA 
 1977 – NA 
 1976 – Pine Bluff (2), Earle 
 1975 – LR Mount St. Mary
 1974 – LR Parkview
 1973 – LR Hall (3)
 1972 – LR Hall (2)
 1971 – tie-LR Hall-Pine Bluff

See also 

 Arkansas Activities Association
 List of Arkansas state high school football champions
 List of Arkansas state high school basketball champions
 List of Arkansas state high school baseball champions
 List of Arkansas state high school soccer champions
 List of Arkansas state high school swimming champions
 List of Arkansas state high school track and field champions

References

External links 
 Tennis at Arkansas Activities Association

Tennis
high school tennis